Luka Muzenjak (born 4 July 1993) is a Croatian footballer who plays as a defensive midfielder for Nk Dilj, Vinkovci.

Club career

HNK Cibalia Vinkovci
Luka Muzenjak has followed the entire Academy of HNK Cibalia Vinkovci and is promoted from Cibalia Vinkovci U19 to Cibalia's senior side.

The Croatian powerhouse offers balance to his team offensively and defensively and has 102 appearances for HNK Cibalia Vincovci and 20 international caps for Croatia (U16-U19) to his name. He is a talented two footed player with intelligent passing ability as well as being very strong defensively, in and out of possession.

Renowned as a tactical leader, he understands the manager's call-card words to defensive midfielders of "position, stability and control". He is an 'assistant coach on the pitch', interpreting and applying the manager's approach.

In 2013 he seemed to be on the verge to join Italian giants A.S. Roma. He joined BSK Bijelo Brdo in 2019 and hung up his professional boots in summer 2021 and started a restaurant.

References

External links
 

1993 births
Living people
Sportspeople from Vinkovci
Association football midfielders
Croatian footballers
Croatia youth international footballers
HNK Cibalia players
NK Zavrč players
HNK Segesta players
FC Ordabasy players
NK BSK Bijelo Brdo players
Croatian Football League players
First Football League (Croatia) players
Slovenian PrvaLiga players
Kazakhstan Premier League players

Croatian expatriate footballers
Expatriate footballers in Slovenia
Croatian expatriate sportspeople in Slovenia